Anu Mariam Jose is an Indian athlete. She won a gold medal in the 4 × 400 m relay  in the 2013 Asian Athletics Championships.

References

Living people
Year of birth missing (living people)
Indian female sprinters